Hochbetrieb (Nuts & Bolts in English) is a 2003 silent, slapstick short film lasting six minutes. Written and directed by Andreas Krein, it received a Menzione Speciale (Special Mention) at the Venice Film Festival - "For having paid a tribute to Harold Lloyd, who shall not be forgotten, by means of modern technology." Set on top of a high-rise construction site in the 1930s, the film depicts the antics of a foreman and his apprentice while hunting for a frog and stolen food.

The film was shot entirely in front of bluescreen in 2001. Principal photography was followed by two years of post production to create the construction site and city environment (the latter generated procedurally in part). After its release, Hochbetrieb was invited to over 100 film festivals worldwide, including TriBeCa Film Festival and the Berlinale Kinderfilmfest. It won the German Federal Film Board's short film award, Short Tiger, and the Friedrich Wilhelm Murnau Shortfilm Award.

In 2004 it received theatrical release as part of a feature-length short film compilation.

External links
 

German comedy short films
2003 short films
2000s German films